Sclerocarya gillettii is a species of plant in the family Anacardiaceae. It is endemic to Kenya.

References

Flora of Kenya
gillettii
Vulnerable plants
Endemic flora of Kenya
Taxonomy articles created by Polbot